Julian is a 2012 Australian short film written and directed by Matthew Moore.

The film is set in a 1981 classroom. It explores a day in the life of a nine-year-old Julian Assange, played by a then-unknown Ed Oxenbould.

Julian won a Flickerfest Special Jury Award, a Crystal Bear at the Berlin International Film Festival and an AACTA Award for Best Short Fiction Film. Lead actor, Ed Oxenbould, was nominated for an AACTA for Best Young Actor.

Cast 
 Ed Oxenbould as Julian 
 Leon Ford as Mr. Braybon 
 Morgan Davies as Cassandra
 Joseph Famularo as Geoff
 Will Cottle as Carl 
 Christopher Stollery as Mr. Dexter
 Catherine Moore as Mrs. Cunliffe

Notes

References

External links 
 

Australian comedy short films
2012 short films
2012 films
Cultural depictions of Julian Assange
2010s English-language films
2010s Australian films